Nhlanhla Vincent Xaba is a South African politician who has been a member of the National Assembly of South Africa for the African National Congress since April 2022. He is a member of the Portfolio Committee on Health.

References

Living people
Year of birth missing (living people)
Zulu people
African National Congress politicians
Members of the National Assembly of South Africa